Amitabh Kumar "Amit" Singhal (born September 1968) is a former senior vice president at Google Inc. having been a Google Fellow and the head of Google's Search team for 15 years.

Biography 
Born in Jhansi, a city in the state of Uttar Pradesh, India, Singhal received a Bachelor of Engineering degree in computer science from IIT Roorkee in 1989. He continued his computer science education in the United States, and received an M.S. degree from University of Minnesota Duluth in 1991. He wrote about his time at the University of Minnesota Duluth:

Singhal continued his studies at Cornell University in Ithaca, New York, and received a Ph.D. degree in 1996. At Cornell, Singhal studied with Gerard Salton, a pioneer in the field of information retrieval, the academic discipline which forms the foundation of modern search. John Battelle, in his book The Search, calls Gerard Salton "the father of digital search." After getting a Ph.D. in 1996, Singhal joined AT&T Labs (previously a part of Bell Labs), where he continued his research in information retrieval, speech retrieval and other related fields.

Controversy 

He left Google on 26 February 2016, following sexual harassment allegations. 

He later joined Uber as Senior Vice President of software engineering in 2017 but was asked to resign for failing to disclose the reason for his resignation from Google. It was later revealed that Google paid him $35 Million as his exit package

Career 
In 2000, he was recruited by friend Krishna Bharat to join Google. Singhal ran Google's core search quality department where he and his team were responsible for the Google search algorithms. According to The New York Times, Singhal was the "master" of Google's ranking algorithm – the formulas that decide which Web pages best answer each user's question. As a reward for his rewrite of the search engine in 2001, Singhal was named a "Google Fellow". Singhal served as the head of Google's core search ranking team until his retirement announced on 26 February 2016.

In 2017, he joined Uber as SVP of engineering, reporting to CEO Travis Kalanick, and with his fellow Google alum Kevin Thompson operating as SVP of marketplace engineering.

Honors and awards 
In 2011 he was inducted as a Fellow of the Association for Computing Machinery.
Fortune named Singhal one of the smartest people in tech.
In 2011, Singhal was given the Outstanding Achievement in Science and Technology Award at The Asian Awards.
He was elected member of the National Academy of Engineering.

References

External links 
 Amit Singhal's homepage

1968 births
Indian emigrants to the United States
University of Minnesota Duluth alumni
Cornell University alumni
American Hindus
Google employees
Google Fellows
American people of Indian descent
American businesspeople
Living people
Fellows of the Association for Computing Machinery
Members of the United States National Academy of Engineering
AT&T people
IIT Roorkee alumni
People from Jhansi
American software engineers
Uber people